Ng Man Hei (born 13 November 2000) is a Hong Kong professional footballer who currently plays for Hong Kong Premier League club HK U23.

Career statistics

Club

Notes

References

Living people
2000 births
Hong Kong footballers
Association football forwards
Hong Kong First Division League players
Hong Kong Premier League players
Tai Po FC players
TSW Pegasus FC players
HK U23 Football Team players